

ama-amb

amadinone (INN)
amafolone (INN)
amanozine (INN)
amantadine (INN)
amantanium bromide (INN)
amantocillin (INN)
Amaphen
Amaryl (Sanofi-Aventis), also known as glimepiride
Amatine
amatuximab (USAN)
ambamustine (INN)
ambasilide (INN)
ambazone (INN)
ambenonium chloride (INN)
ambenoxan (INN)
Ambenyl
Ambi 10
ambicromil (INN)
Ambien (Sanofi-Aventis), also known as zolpidem
Ambisome
Ambodryl
ambomycin (INN)
ambroxol (INN)
ambruticin (INN)
ambucaine (INN)
ambucetamide (INN)
ambuside (INN)

amc-ame
Amcill
amcinafal (INN)
amcinafide (INN)
amcinonide (INN)
Amcort
amdoxovir (USAN)
amebucort (INN)
amedalin (INN)
amediplase (INN)
amelometasone (INN)
ameltolide (INN)
Amen
amenamevir (INN)
Amerge (GlaxoSmithKline)
Amerscan MDP Kit
amesergide (INN)
ametantrone (INN)
Ametop
Amevive
amezepine (INN)
amezinium metilsulfate (INN)

amf
amfebutamone
amfecloral (INN)
amfenac (INN)
amfepentorex (INN)
amfepramone (INN)
amfetamine (INN)
amfetaminil (INN)
amflutizole (INN)
amfomycin (INN)
amfonelic acid (INN)

ami

amib-amil
amibegron (USAN, INN)
Amibid LA
Amicar
amicarbalide (INN)
amicibone (INN)
amicycline (INN)
amidantel (INN)
amidapsone (INN)
Amidate
amidefrine mesilate (INN)
amifampridine INN
amiflamine (INN)
amifloverine (INN)
amifloxacin (INN)
amifostine (INN)
Amigesic
amiglumide (INN)
amikacin (INN)
amikhelline (INN)
Amikin
amilomotide (INN)
amiloride (INN)

amin-amio
Amin-Aid
amindocate (INN)
amineptine (INN)
Aminess
aminitrozole (INN)
Amino-Cerv
Amino-Opti-E
aminoacridine (INN)
aminocaproic acid (INN)
aminoethyl nitrate (INN)
aminoglutethimide (INN)
aminometradine (INN)
aminophenazone cyclamate (INN)
aminophenazone (INN)
Aminophyllin
aminophylline (INN)
aminopromazine (INN)
aminopterin sodium (INN)
aminoquinol (INN)
aminoquinuride (INN)
aminorex (INN)
Aminosol
aminothiazole (INN)
Aminoxin
aminoxytriphene (INN)
amiodarone (INN)

amip-amix
Amipaque
amiperone (INN)
amiphenazole (INN)
amipizone (INN)
amiprilose (INN)
amiquinsin (INN)
amisometradine (INN)
amisulpride (INN)
amiterol (INN)
Amitid
amitivir (INN)
Amitone
amitraz (INN)
Amitril
amitriptyline (INN)
amitriptylinoxide (INN)
amixetrine (INN)

aml-amo
AmLactin
amlexanox (INN)
amlintide (INN)
amlodipine (INN)
Amnesteem
Amnestrogen
AMO Vitrax
amobarbital (INN)
amocarzine (INN)
amodiaquine (INN)
amogastrin (INN)
Amohexal (Hexal Australia) [Au], also known as amoxicillin.
amolanone (INN)
amolimogene bepiplasmid (USAN)
amonafide (INN)
Amonidrin Tablet
amoproxan (INN)
amopyroquine (INN)
amorolfine (INN)
Amoscanate (INN)
Amosene
amotosalen hydrochloride (USAN)
amosulalol (INN)
amoxapine (INN)
amoxecaine (INN)
amoxicillin (INN)
amoxicillin/clavulanic acid
Amoxicot
Amoxil
amoxydramine camsilate (INN)

amp-amy
amperozide (INN)
amphenidone (INN)
amphetamine
Amphicol
Amphocin
Amphojel
amphotalide (INN)
Amphotec
amphotericin B (INN)
ampicillin (INN)
ampiroxicam (INN)
amprenavir
amprolium (INN)
AMPT
ampyrimine (INN)
ampyzine (INN)
amquinate (INN)
Amrinone
amrinone (INN)
amrubicin (INN)
amsacrine (INN)
amsilarotene (USAN)
amtolmetin guacil (INN)
amustaline dihydrochloride (USAN)
amuvatinib (USAN, INN)
Amvaz
Amvisc
amylmetacresol (INN)
Amytal